Philippe Schnyder (born 17 March 1978 in Rapperswil) is a Swiss former professional cyclist.

Major results
2002
1st Grand Prix Osterhas
2003
1st Duo Normand (with Jean Nuttli)
2004
2nd Tour du Sénégal
2005
1st  National Hill Climb Championships

References

External links

1978 births
Living people
Swiss male cyclists
People from Rapperswil-Jona
Sportspeople from the canton of St. Gallen